The 2022–23 North American winter was the winter in North America, as it occurred across the continent from late 2022 to early 2023. The winter season in North America began at the winter solstice, which occurred on December 21, 2022, and it ended at the March equinox, which occurred on March 20, 2023. The first day of meteorological winter began on December 1 and unofficially ended on February 28; winter storms may still occur outside of these limits.

Seasonal forecasts 

On October 20, 2022, the National Oceanic and Atmospheric Administration's Climate Prediction Center released its outlook for the upcoming winter in the United States. Temperatures were favored to be below normal in the Pacific Northwest and Northern Plains, and above normal in the Southwestern United States, Southeastern United States and Northeastern United States. Temperatures were forecast to be above average in Hawaii and near average across most of Alaska. Precipitation was forecast to be above normal in the Pacific Northwest and Great Lakes region, and below normal in the Southwestern United States and Southeastern United States. Western Alaska was forecast to have above normal precipitation, as was Hawaii.

Seasonal summary 

On October 17, a minor early-season cold-core low impacted the Upper Peninsula of Michigan, with some areas receiving  of snow, and over 30,000 customers losing power. This resulted in the heaviest October snow on record for Marquette, Michigan across a two day period. Over the next few days, cold air pushed south, breaking records in the Midwest and Deep South. For the first time in history, Tallahassee, Florida froze before Denver, Colorado. On November 4, a winter storm on the backend of a tornado outbreak led to a 100-car pileup in Denver forcing 6th Avenue to close. The crash led to 13 injuries, one of which was serious. On November 9, a major winter storm struck North Dakota, leading to a pileup causing several injuries on Interstate 94. An intense lake-effect snowstorm produced massive snow accumulations, primarily situated in the Buffalo area, with the highest total of snowfall peaking  in Orchard Park, New York. Prior to the Christmas holiday, another snowstorm occurred, which led to 106 deaths, 41 in the Buffalo area alone. On January 8, icy roads in Iowa led to a car crash, killing 2.

Events

Early November blizzard

Starting late on November 9, a significant blizzard affected the Midwestern United States. The Storm Prediction Center issued a Mesoscale Discussion 1938 stating portions of North Dakota and Minnesota would have  snowfall rates per hour for much of the day on November 10. On November 10,  of ice was reported west-northwest of Westwood Colony, South Dakota. On Interstate 94 in North Dakota, a pileup of at least two dozen cars resulted in “numerous” injuries, but no fatalities. Between Fargo and Grand Forks, portions of Interstate 29 closed.  of snow was reported in Ralph, South Dakota. In Bismarck, North Dakota,  fell, making it the second snowiest day in Bismarck on record. The Winter Storm was unofficially named Winter Storm Alejandra by The Weather Channel.

Mid-November winter storm 

An intense lake-effect snow storm produced massive snow accumulations in the Buffalo metropolitan area. In preparation for the storm, the NFL game between the Buffalo Bills and Cleveland Browns game was moved to Detroit. In addition, New York Governor Kathy Hochul declared a state of emergency for 11 counties in Upstate New York. On the New York Thruway west of Exit 46, the road closed on November 17 at 4pm. Multiple Amtrak stations such as Buffalo, Niagara Falls and Depew, and Eric County suspended all bus service. Hamburg recorded  of snow by 8am on November 18. In Buffalo, from 8-9pm  fell. Reed Timmer measured 50 inches of snow at 9:30pm in Hamburg. Over 6,000 customers lost power. By the morning of November 19, Hamilton Park reported 70.9 inches of snow. Orchard Park reached 80 inches of snow, and 66 inches of snow in 24 hours, which broke the record for the area. Buffalo International Airport reported 36.6 inches by the end of the storm. Hamburg, New York eventually reported 81.2 inches of snow, being the highest total from the storm. Heavy lake-effect snow also occurred in Watertown where 61 inches of snow was reported.

Mid-December blizzard 

A major blizzard occurred in the Great Plains related to a tornado outbreak, leading to heavy snow and freezing rain. In Fargo, North Dakota, all after school activities on December 13 were canceled. Parts of Interstate 80 in Nebraska and Interstate 76 in Colorado were shut down due to the blizzard, as was part of Interstate 90 in South Dakota. Portions of Interstate 29 were also shut down as the storm approached. Further east, blizzard conditions and thundersnow were verified in Duluth, Minnesota. Power outages totaled 45,000 in Minnesota, 70,000 in Wisconsin and 43,700 in Michigan. In Penn State University, the snowstorm forced the final exams to be rescheduled from December 15 to December 16 and 17. Small portions of Interstate 80 in Pennsylvania closed due to the storm. As of the morning of December 16, snow accumulations reached  in Wilmington, Vermont. In New Hampshire, many regions received over 20 inches by the storm's end. Ultimately, over 160,000 customers in the Northeast lost power, including over 100,000 in New Hampshire alone.

Pre-Christmas blizzard and cold snap 

Just prior to the Christmas holiday, another powerful and significant blizzard, unofficially named Winter Storm Elliott by The Weather Channel, began developing in southern Canada along an arctic front. It additionally dropped significant snowfall and record-breaking cold to the northern parts of the United States. Parts of the state saw over a foot of snow. In Casper, the low of  set an all time record. Eight thousand customers in Wichita, Kansas lost power, and portions of Interstate 435 closed due to snow. The highest snowfall totals in Iowa reached . The winter storm led to 104 deaths, with 41 occurring in the Buffalo metropolitan area alone.

December–January California atmospheric rivers 

A series of atmospheric rivers starting on December 31 and extending into 2023 caused widespread heavy rainfall and snowfall in Northern California and Nevada, leading to flooding. At least 22 people were killed, although it is unknown how many fatalities were due to winter weather. President Joe Biden declared a state of emergency in California due to the winter storms.

Late January – Early February ice storm 

An ice storm impacted the southern portion of the Great Plains at the end of January. In Texas, at least ten people died, all due to car accidents. Additionally, over a thousand flights were cancelled at Dallas Fort Worth International Airport, and over 563,000 customers were left without power.

Early February cold wave 
Schools in Boston, Massachusetts closed on February 3 in anticipation of the cold temperatures. Atop Mount Washington in New Hampshire, the wind chill hit , the coldest wind chill in the United States. The cold wave caused 5,000 power outages in Connecticut. The temperature in Bridgeport, Connecticut of  broke the previous record by 9°F (5°C). Several frostquakes occurred in Maine. Strong winds relating to the arctic front killed a passenger in a car in western Massachusetts when a tree fell on the car.

Late February storm complex

A winter storm, unofficially named Winter Storm Olive by the The Weather Channel, was impacting the Midwestern United States from February 21-24. Another winter storm associated with the broader system moved through the same general area shortly thereafter.

There were 13 fatalities, at least 1,200,000 power outages, and at least 3,000 flights cancelled by the storm.

See also 

March 2023 nor'easter
List of major snow and ice events in the United States
Winter storm
2022–23 European windstorm season
Tornadoes of 2022
Tornadoes of 2023
Weather of 2022
Weather of 2023

Notes

References

 
2022 meteorology
2023 meteorology
2022 in North America
2023 in North America
North American winters